Ajnuj is a village that is situated west of the taluka city of Khandala in the Satara district of Maharashtra, India, on the Khandala-Bhor Road. The MSRTC Depot of Khandala is in Ajnuj.

References 
Villages in Satara district